Hüseyin Hilmi Bey or İştirakçi (Socialist) Hilmi (1885 – 16 November 1922) was one of the early Turkish socialists. He was the founder and first General Chairman of the Ottoman Socialist Party and the Socialist Party of Turkey.

Early years 

Hüseyin Hilmi was born in İzmir. Hilmi's birth date is not clearly known. He worked as a civil servant in İzmir.

Hilmi Before He Became a Socialist 
In İzmir, Hilmi published a newspaper named Serbest İzmir (Free İzmir or Liberal İzmir) in 1907. He was a supporter of the Ottoman Liberty Party and Prince Sabahaddin.

İştirakçi Hilmi 
He received an inheritance from his father and went to Romania in the following years. In Romania, Hilmi was affected by labour movements and he became a socialist. Hilmi published İştirak on 13 February 1909. Now, Hilmi was known with İştirak Newspaper. And he was called İştirakçi Hilmi.

Ottoman Socialist Party era 
The Ottoman Socialist Party was founded by Hüseyin Hilmi, Namık Hasan, İbnül Tahir İsmail Faik, Baha Tevfik and Hamit Suphi on August 1910. İştirak became a periodical for the defense of socialism among Ottoman intellectuals. İştirak introduced different branches of socialism to its readers. It was the first time that the thoughts of Karl Marx were defended systematically in the Ottoman Press. The Ottoman Socialist Party was closed in 1912. After the assassination of Mahmut Şevket Pasha, Hilmi was exiled to Sinop Fortress Prison in 1913.

Ottoman Socialist Party in Paris Branch 
Paris Branch of OSF was founded by Doctor Refik Nevzat in the 1910s. After the closing of the party in Istanbul and the exiling of Hilmi, Refik Nevzat became the only representative person of the party. He published 3 brochures for OSF named Siyaset-i Hazıra-i Meş'ume (Current Sinister Politics), Sosyalizm ve Rehber-i Amele (Socialism and Vanguard Workers) and Haraç Mezat Satıyoruz (Auctions Sell Tribute).

Socialist Party of Turkey 
After the Armistice of Mudros Hüseyin Hilmi returned to Istanbul. On 20 February 1325 (1919), the Socialist Party of Turkey was founded by Hüseyin Hilmi and another 13 persons.  Compared to the Ottoman Socialist Party, the Socialist Party of Turkey was positioned more to the left. Also TSF was a member of the Second International.The Party published the newspaper İdrak.

Strikes and TSF 
In Istanbul, in 1920, the Ottoman worker class launched several strikes for occupation of the country, poor wages, and other reasons. In this atmosphere, TSF became popular among Istanbul workers.

Second Congress and dissolution 
On 31 October 1920 Party prepared a second congress. In this congress Hüseyin Hilmi became founder and unchangeable leader. With this, the opposition tried to exile Hilmi and friends. But Hilmi and Hilmi's friends survived this opposition. With this, the opposition split from the party and founded the Independent Socialist Party. After the split, the party lost power.

Third Congress and exiling of Hilmi 
On 8 March 1922, the party prepared a third congress. In this congress, Hilmi and supporters were exiled from the party. The party was democratic again but it did not have any effect on the outcome. The party was dissolved.

Killing of Hilmi 
On 16 November 1922 Hüseyin Hilmi was killed by a police officer named Ali Haydar. At the first, Ali Haydar said Hilmi was trying to rape him so then he killed the Rapist Hilmi. But he changed his statement after and said Hilmi was killed by unknown men.

References 
 Y. Doğan Çetinkaya and Foti Benlisoy, “İştirakçi Hilmi,” Modern Türkiye’de Siyasi Düşünce, Sol, Vol. VIII, İstanbul: İletişim Yayınları, 2007, pp. 165-183.pdf
 Y. Doğan Çetinkaya, “Sosyalizmi İdrak Etmek: Bir Mütareke Dönemi Gazetesi,” Mete Tunçay’a Armağan, İstanbul: İletişim Yayınları, 2007, pp. 499-536.pdf
 Erdem, Hamit, Osmanlı Sosyalist Fırkası ve İştirakçi Hilmi

Footnotes

References

External links 
 Original PDF scans of Ishtirak (İchtirak)

1922 deaths
Assassinated Turkish politicians
Turkish socialists
People from İzmir
1885 births